Mortlock is a surname. Notable people with the surname include:
John Mortlock (1755–1816), British banker and politician
Stirling Mortlock (born 1977), Australian rugby player
Bryce Mortlock (1921–2004), Australian architect
David Favis-Mortlock (born 1953), English geomorphologist and musician
The Mortlock family of Martindale Hall included
William Ranson Mortlock (1821–1884), South Australian grazier and politician (father)
William Tennant Mortlock (1858–1913), South Australian grazier and politician (son)

See also
Mortlock Flying Fox, a species of flying fox
Mortlock Football League, an Australian rules football league in Western Australia
Mortlock Islands (disambiguation)
Mortlock Library of Australiana, in the Mortlock wing of the State Library of South Australia
Mortlock Shield, football competition in South Australia